Agyrta micilia is a moth of the subfamily Arctiinae. It was described by Pieter Cramer in 1780. It is found in Brazil (Pará) and Venezuela.

References

Moths described in 1780
Arctiinae
Moths of South America